Žampach is a municipality and village in Ústí nad Orlicí District in the Pardubice Region of the Czech Republic. It has about 300 inhabitants.

Administrative parts
The village of Hlavná is an administrative part of Žampach.

Sights
In Žampach there are the early Baroque Žampach Castle and ruins of the former Gothic castle.

References

External links

Villages in Ústí nad Orlicí District